Elena Sazonenkova (born 22 October 1973 in Riga) is a former Soviet artistic gymnast. She was a member of the team that won gold at the 1989 World Championships. Individually, she finished sixth in the beam finals with a 9.825. She was the all-around champion at the 1991 Summer Universiade. Sazonenkova was not eligible for the 1992 Summer Olympics due to Latvia's decision to compete as an independent nation.

References

External links 
 List of Competitive Results at Gymn Forum

1973 births
Living people
Soviet female artistic gymnasts
Medalists at the World Artistic Gymnastics Championships
Sportspeople from Riga
Universiade medalists in gymnastics
Universiade gold medalists for the Soviet Union
Universiade silver medalists for the Soviet Union
Universiade bronze medalists for the Soviet Union